This article serves as an index – as complete as possible – of all the honorific orders or similar decorations awarded by Tonga, classified by Monarchies chapter and Republics chapter, and, under each chapter, recipients' countries and the detailed list of recipients.

Awards

Tonga

Orders 
 King Tupou VI  (18.03.2012 - )
  Grand Master of the Royal Order of Pouono  
  Grand Master of the Royal Order of King George Tupou I
  Grand Master of the Most Illustrious Order of Queen Salote Tupou III - Knight Grand Cross (31.7.2008) 
  Grand Master of the Royal Order of the Crown of Tonga
  Grand Master of the Royal Order of the Phoenix
  Grand Master of the Royal Military Order of St. George
  Grand Master of the Most Devoted Royal Household Order of Tonga - Knight Grand Cross (1.8.2011)
  Grand Master of the Royal Order of Oceania
 Queen Nanasipau'u Tuku'aho: 
  King George Tupou V Royal Family Order (1.8.2011) 
 Crown Prince Tupouto'a 'Ulukalala: 
  Knight Grand Cross  of the Order of Queen Salote Tupou III (31.7.2008)
 Princess Lātūfuipeka Tukuʻaho: 
  King George Tupou V Royal Family Order of Tonga (1.8.2011).
 Princess Salote Mafile'o Pilolevu Tuita :
  Knight Grand Cross of the Royal Order of the Crown of Tonga (31.7.2008)
  King George Tupou V Royal Family Order (1.8.2011) 
 Captain Siosa'ia Ma'ulupekotofa Tuita, 9th Tuita
  Knight Grand Cross of the Most Illustrious Order of Queen Salote Tupou III (31.7.2008)
 Viliami Tupoulahi Mailefihi Tuku’aho, Prince Tu’i Pelehake (Prince Sione Ngu's 2nd son)
  Knight Grand Cross of the Royal Order of the Crown of Tonga (31.7.2008)
 Princess Mele Siu'ilikutapu Tuku'aho [Princess Mele Siu'ilikutapu Kalaniuvalu-Fotofili] (Prince Sione Ngu's eldest daughter)
  Knight Grand Cross with Collar of the Most Illustrious Order of Queen Salote Tupou III (31.7.2008)
  Knight Grand Cross with Collar of the Royal Order of the Crown of Tonga (31.7.2008)
  King George Tupou V Royal Family Order  (1.8.2011)
 Princess 'Elisiva Fusipala Tauki'onetuku Tuku'aho [Princess 'Elisiva Vaha'i] (Prince Sione Ngu's 2nd daughter)
  King George Tupou V Royal Family Order (1.8.2011) 
 Princess Lavinia Mata-'o-Taone Tuku'aho [Princess Lavinia Ma'afu] (Prince Sione Ngu's 3rd daughter)
  King George Tupou V Royal Family Order (1.8.2011) 
 Princess Sinaitakala 'Ofeina-'e he-Langi Tuku'aho [Princess Sinaitakala Fakafanua]  (Prince Sione Ngu's 4th daughter and Crown Princess' mother)
  King George Tupou V Royal Family Order (1.8.2011)

Decorations
  King Taufa’ahau Tupou IV Coronation Silver Jubilee Medal (4.7.1992)  
  King George Tupou V Coronation Medal (31.7.2008 ) 
  Tonga Defence Services General Service (Bougainville) Medal 
  Tonga Defence Services Long Service and  Good Conduct Medal  
  'Uluafu Gold Medal of Merit (September 1971)

Australia
 Quentin Bryce, Former 25th Governor-General of Australia: Knight Grand Cross of the Order of the Crown
 Reverend D'Arcy Wood, Former President of the Uniting Church in Australia:
 Knight Grand Cross of the Order of the Crown
 Recipient of the King Tupou VI Coronation Medal

Austrian Imperial and Royal Family

 Crown Prince Karl:
 Knight Grand Cross of the Order of the Royal House, Special Class
 Recipient of the King Tupou VI Coronation Medal
 Archduke Georg:
 Knight Grand Cross of the Order of the Royal House
 Recipient of the King Tupou VI Coronation Medal

Ducal Family of Hohenberg
 Princess Marie-Therese:
 Knight Grand Cross of the Order of the Royal House
 Recipient of the King Tupou VI Coronation Medal

Bhutan
 King Jigme Khesar: Knight Grand Cross of the Order of Queen Salote Tupou III

Fiji

 Epeli Nailatikau, 8th President of Fiji:
 Knight Grand Cross of the Royal Military Order of St George
 Recipient of the King Tupou VI Coronation Medal

Japan
 Emperor Naruhito I:
 Knight Grand Cross with Collar of the Order of the Crown
 Recipient of the King George Tupou V Coronation Medal
 Recipient of the King Tupou VI Coronation Medal
 Empress Masako:
 Dame Grand Cross of the Order of Queen Salote Tupou III
 Recipient of the King Tupou VI Coronation Medal

Māori Royal Family
 King Tuheitia:
 Knight Grand Cross of the Order of the Crown
 Knight Grand Cross of the Royal Household Order, 1st Class
 Recipient of the King George Tupou V Coronation Medal
 Recipient of the King Tupou VI Coronation Medal
 Makau Ariki Atawhai:
 Dame Grand Cross of the Royal Household Order, 1st Class
 Recipient of the King Tupou VI Coronation Medal

Thailand
 Princess Sirindhorn:
 Knight Grand Cross with Collar of the Order of the Crown
 Recipient of the King George Tupou V Coronation Medal

Two Sicilian Royal Family
 Prince Carlo, Duke of Castro: Knight Grand Cross of the Order of the Royal House, Special Class
 Princess Camilla, Duchess of Castro: Dame Grand Cross of the Order of the Royal House, Special Class

United Kingdom
 Queen Elizabeth II: Knight Grand Cross of the Order of Queen Salote Tupou III
 Prince Richard, Duke of Gloucester: 
 Knight Grand Cross of the Order of the Crown
 Recipient of the King George Tupou V Coronation Medal
 Birgitte, Duchess of Gloucester: 
 Dame Grand Cross of the Order of the Crown
 Recipient of the King George Tupou V Coronation Medal
 Simon Arthur, 4th Baron Glenarthur
 Knight Grand Cross of the Order of the Crown
 Recipient of the King George Tupou V Coronation Medal
 Recipient of the King Tupou VI Coronation Medal
 Harry Lamin: Knight Commander of the Order of the Crown
 Recipient of the King George Tupou V Coronation Medal

United States

 Adrienne L. Kaeppler, President of the International Council for Traditional Music:
 Member of the Royal Household Order
 Recipient of the King George Tupou V Coronation Medal

See also 
 Mirror page: List of honours of the Tongan Royal Family by country

References 

 
Tonga